Gaylord is a name of Norman French origin, from the Old French gaillard meaning "joyful" or "high-spirited".  People with the given name of Gaylord include the following:

Arts and entertainment

Music 
 Gaylord Birch (1946–1996), drummer for the bands Santana, Cold Blood, Pointer Sisters & Herbie Hancock
 Gaylord Carter (1905–2000), American organist and the composer of many film scores
 Gaylord Yost (1888–1958), violinist, composer, and teacher

Writing 
 Gaylord J. Clarke (1836–1870), American newspaper editor, lawyer, poet and politician
 Gaylord DuBois (1899–1993), American writer of comic book stories, comic strips, Big Little Books, and juvenile adventure novels
 Gaylord Larsen (born 1932), American crime writer
 Gaylord Shaw (1942–2015), American journalist

Other arts and entertainment 
 Gaylord Lloyd (1888–1943), American actor and assistant director, brother of Harold Lloyd
 Gaylord Schanilec (born 1955), American wood engraver and printer

Government 
 Gaylord Kent Conrad (born 1948), United States Senator from North Dakota from 1987 to 1992, and again from 1992 to 2013. 
 Gaylord Graves (1804–1889), member of the Wisconsin State Assembly
 Gaylord Griswold (1767–1809), United States Representative from New York
 Gaylord Nelson (1916–2005), American politician from Wisconsin and the founder of Earth Day
 Gaylord T. Gunhus (1940–2016), retired American Army officer and 20th Chief of Chaplains of the United States Army

Sports 
 Gaylord Bryan (1927–2015), male long and triple jumper from the United States
 (born 1980), French gymnast
 Gaylord Perry (1938–2022), American Major League Baseball right-handed pitcher
 Gaylord Powless (1946–2001), Mohawk lacrosse player
 Gaylord Silly (born 1986), French-Seychellois long-distance runner
 Gaylord Stinchcomb (1895–1973), American football player

Other fields 
 Gaylord Granville Bennett (bishop) (1882–1975), American bishop
 Gaylord Donnelley (1911–1992), owner and board member of R. R. Donnelley
 Gaylord Harnwell (1903–1982), American educator and physicist
 George Gaylord Simpson (1902–1984), paleontologist
 Gaylord K. Swim (1948–2005), American businessman
 Gaylord Starin White (1864–1931), American social reformer and activist
 Gaylord Wilshire (1861–1927), land developer, publisher and outspoken socialist

See also 
 Gaylord (disambiguation)
 Galliard (disambiguation)
 Gaillard (disambiguation)
 Gayelord Hauser (1895–1984)

References 

English-language masculine given names
English masculine given names